José Luiz Carbone (22 March 1946 – 27 December 2020) was a Brazilian football player and coach.

Career
Born in São Paulo, Carbone played as a defensive midfielder for São Paulo, Ponte Preta, Metropol, Internacional, Botafogo and Nacional (SP), as well as the Brazil national team.

He later worked as a manager with 30 clubs, including Fluminense and Guarani.

Carbone died of liver cancer in hospital in Campinas on 27 December 2020.

References

1946 births
2020 deaths
Brazilian footballers
Brazil international footballers
São Paulo FC players
Associação Atlética Ponte Preta players
Esporte Clube Metropol players
Sport Club Internacional players
Botafogo de Futebol e Regatas players
Nacional Atlético Clube (SP) players
Association football midfielders
Brazilian football managers
Fluminense FC managers
Guarani FC managers
Deaths from liver cancer
Deaths from cancer in São Paulo (state)
Footballers from São Paulo
Club Blooming managers